Mona the Vampire is an animated children's television series based on the children's book of the same name written and illustrated by Sonia Holleyman (itself adapted to the novel series, itself illustrated by Holleyman and written by Hiawyn Oram). The series aired in Canada on YTV from September 13, 1999 to February 22, 2006; in France, it first aired on France 3 on October 30, 2000.

Mona the Vampire was co-produced by the CINAR Corporation, Alphanim, Animation Services (in Hong Kong; season 3) and YTV in co-production with France 3, Canal J (seasons 1 and 2) and Tiji (seasons 3 and 4), with the participation of the Independent Production Fund, the Shaw Children's Programming Initiative and Telefilm Canada.

Synopsis
The series follows the adventures of Mona Parker, who refers to herself as "Mona the Vampire", as well as her two best friends, Lily Duncan ("Princess Giant") and Charley Bones ("Zapman"), and her pet cat, Fang, as they imagine themselves confronting a new supernatural foe, or solving a supernatural mystery, in every episode, but there are always rational explanations for what they see.

Episodes

There are a total of 65 full episodes of Mona the Vampire. Each episode is approximately 22 minutes long, and each full episode contains two 11-minute episodes. Four seasons of Mona the Vampire were produced. The first season contains 26 full episodes, while seasons 2, 3, and 4 each contains 13 full episodes.

Cast

Main
 Mona Parker ("Mona the Vampire") (voiced by Emma Taylor-Isherwood) - A ten-year-old girl with a vivid imagination and a naive personality who imagines herself as a vampire hero coming out to save the day. She believes the town she lives in is overrun with supernatural monsters, and she plans to stop them all and save the town on a daily basis. Although Mona's imagination can cause trouble at times, her imagination has more often than not proven to be helpful.
 Fang - Mona's pet cat, he is a feline sidekick who always follows Mona everywhere. Fang is her accomplice in the nether realms of her imagination. When going with Mona while in her vampire costume, he has fake wings tied to his back.
 Charles "Charley" Bones ("Zapman") (voiced by Justin Bradley in Seasons 1-3; Evan Smirnow in Season 4) - One of Mona's best friends, he is an intelligent but also timid bespectacled boy in real life. His alter ego is Zapman, who wears a green costume and is armed with a Zapp-A-Rama gun, which really is a water pistol, though he can be seen holding another kind of toy gun. Charley's nemesis is the local school bully George.
 Lily Duncan ("Princess Giant") (voiced by Carrie Finlay) - One of Mona's best friends. She has a timid and slightly paranoid personality at times, but she is still helpful to the team. Her alter ego is Princess Giant, who wears a long blond wig topped with a crown and holds a kind of cat plushie.
 Mr. and Mrs. Parker (voiced by Marcel Jeannin and Carole Jeghers) - Mona's parents. Mrs. Parker is shown to be the stricter of the two, while Mr. Parker is more light-hearted and somewhat clumsy, as he is more likely to believe what Mona thinks in her imagination.
 Angela Smith (voiced by Tia Caroleo) - Mona's snobbish rival, she is a filthy rich girl who frequently flaunts her wealth to her classmates. She also regularly enlists George in her schemes to cause problems for Mona. Her parents won the lottery, explaining her sheer wealth and her resulting spoiledness.

Recurring
 Madeleine Gotto (voiced by Jennifer Seguin) - Mona's teacher. She is very stern, yet also has a habit of falling in love easily. She is often exasperated by Mona's strange ideas and arguments for supernatural occurrences which are ordinary events.
 Principal Ivan Shawbly (voiced by Rick Miller in Seasons 1-3; Stephen Spreekmeester in Season 4) - The strict principal of Mona's school, St. Faith's Elementary. He easily grows tired of Mona's behavior and is quick to discipline her.
 Lawrence (voiced by Michael Yarmush) - Friend of Mona and the gang, and student at St. Faith's Elementary.
 Officer Halcroft (voiced by Gary Jewell in Seasons 1-4; Richard Dumont in Season 4) - The chief of local police. He's become used to Mona's antics, and is quick to offer a more rational explanation to Mona's stories which, ironically, Mona finds rather outlandish and unbelievable.
 George Jamell (voiced by Oliver Grainger in Seasons 1-3; James Harbour in Season 4) - A school bully, he is a mean boy who picks on other kids at school, especially Charley. He is friends with Angela, and often does the job for her schemes, essentially serving as her right hand man.
 Mayor Rosenbaum (voiced by John Stocker) - The town's mayor.
 Mrs. Bryerson (voiced by Sonja Ball) - Mona's elderly neighbor. She has a poodle named Blitzy.
 Reverend Gregory (voiced by Louis Negin) - The local reverend.

Production

Book basis
Mona the Vampire is based on a children's book of the same name that was published in the United Kingdom by Orchard Books in 1990 and was written and illustrated by Sonia Holleyman. The book was the first in a Mona children's book series. Holleyman's original idea of Mona, as represented in the original Mona books, led more towards a girl with a great imagination who, like many children, likes to experiment with multiple different obsessions.

The concept would be retooled in 1995 with the release of a series of Mona the Vampire novels, this time written by Hiawyn Oram, with Holleyman still illustrating. In these books, Mona is now solely obsessed with her vampire superhero persona. Four novels would be published from the mid-to-late 1990s, and would serve as the basis for the television series.

Television adaptation
The series began development in the mid 1990s. It was originally pitched around to various British networks, but after no success, Ian Lewis, along with his production company, The Farnham Film Company, took the project to Canada, where it was picked up by the CINAR corporation. The series entered development in 1997, and it would soon be greenlit for 26 half-hour episodes in early 1998. Production would officially begin in June 1998.

Before Mona the Vampire, CINAR and Alphanim, two of the series' main production companies, had partnered in several other television series, including Are You Afraid of the Dark?, Lassie, and Animal Crackers. In a press release in PR Newswire from June 9, 1998, the leaders of both of these companies predicted that Mona the Vampire would be a great success, and hoped to further the relationship between the two companies with this production.

The theme song score was composed by Judy Henderson, who had also helped compose the theme for Arthur, another CINAR production. The lyrics were written by Judy Rothman, though for unknown reasons, she was not credited. The theme was performed by Quebec singer Lulu Hughes. Like Rothman, she was not credited in the actual show, but on the show's official website, she was credited as Loulou Hughes. Her contribution was confirmed by Henderson in 2022.

The series was renewed for a 2nd season containing 13 half-hour episodes in early 2000. Due to the events of the CINAR scandal, Telefilm Canada and the Canadian Television Fund had suspended business with CINAR. This would affect funding for the 2nd season, although Peter Moss, then the President of CINAR, stated that the funding was "not a very high percentage of the budget."

A 3rd season, containing an additional 13 half-hour episodes, was greenlit in 2001. After production of the 3rd season wrapped up in spring 2002, production on the series went on a hiatus, before the series was eventually renewed for a 4th season, once again containing 13 half-hour episodes, in fall 2002. Production wrapped up in early 2004.

Reception

Critical response
In a retrospective review from The Arcade, Luka Costello was positive about the show, stating that despite the young demographic, "the show was never too preachy. It had witty dialogue and the simple animation is still admirable. It was definitely the humble origins of my love for the supernatural and that theme song was catchy as hell."

Broadcast and streaming
The series was originally premiered in Canada on YTV on September 13, 1999, and later in France on France 3 on October 30, 2000. For Seasons 3 and 4, the series moved to Tiji. In the United Kingdom, the series aired on CBBC, and later on Pop for a brief period.

Despite its success in other territories, the series was not broadcast in the United States during its original run, though attempts were made in the early 2000s. In 2009, Cookie Jar launched Jaroo, a streaming service that housed a majority of their animated properties, including the DIC library, which they had acquired the previous year. Mona was available to stream on Jaroo, being advertised as having its U.S premiere on the platform. The streaming service has since been discontinued.

It would not be until 2011 when the series would finally make its U.S. broadcast premiere on This TV, as part of the Cookie Jar Toons children's programming block. The series would premiere on September 26, 2011, and would run until October 27, 2013. The block was discontinued four days later.

Currently, the first season is available to stream for free on Tubi. The entire series in full is also available on iTunes, Vudu, and Google Play.

Other media

Home media
During and after the show's run, several DVDs containing select episodes of the series were released, especially by Cookie Jar Entertainment. These DVDs sometimes included extra features, such as episode and language selection settings and voiced character descriptions by child voice actors. The complete first season was later released in North America by Mill Creek Entertainment, which featured select episodes from various Cookie Jar shows, including episodes from Busytown Mysteries, Horseland, Wimzie's House, Simon in the Land of Chalk Drawings, Happy Castle and The Wombles.

Website
In 2000, Alphanim, Tiji, and CINAR created a bilingual Adobe Flash-based website under the domain name monathevampire.com. This website featured several games and activities that included characters and settings from the series. The domain had been deactivated by 2016, but archived versions of the site still exist. Due to the discontinuation of the Adobe Flash Player at the end of 2020, archived versions of the website may be inaccessible.

See also

List of vampire television series

References

External links
The archived version of the official Mona the Vampire website

POP Show page

Mona the Vampire
1990s Canadian animated television series
2000s Canadian animated television series
1999 Canadian television series debuts
1999 French television series debuts
2006 Canadian television series endings
2006 French television series endings
Canadian children's animated comedy television series
Canadian children's animated fantasy television series
Canadian children's animated horror television series
Canadian children's animated superhero television series
French children's animated comedy television series
French children's animated fantasy television series
French children's animated horror television series
French children's animated superhero television series
English-language television shows
Gaumont Animation
YTV (Canadian TV channel) original programming
Canadian television shows based on children's books
Television series by Cookie Jar Entertainment
Television series by Corus Entertainment
Vampires in animated television
Animated television series about children
Elementary school television series
France Télévisions children's television series
Vampires in television